Wellington Street is the northernmost of the four primary east-west streets in the central business district of Perth, Western Australia.

Route description
Wellington Street begins at Plain Street in East Perth, as the continuation of Waterloo Crescent. It travels in an east-north-easterly direction, passing the Wellington Square park. In the suburb of Perth, Wellington Street is adjacent to a number of notable buildings and landmarks, including Royal Perth Hospital, Forrest Chase shopping centre, Perth railway station, Yagan Square, Perth Busport, and Perth Arena, before reaching the Mitchell Freeway. The road passes under the freeway with a half-diamond interchange that has a southbound freeway exit ramp and a northbound entrance ramp. Wellington Street continues into West Perth, past the Watertown shopping centre and other commercial properties, until it ends at an intersection with Thomas Street and Roberts Road, near Perth Modern School.

Parts of the street near the railway station are home to several budget hotels and backpacker lodgings, while the more upmarket Hotel Grand Chancellor is located closer to the freeway. 

Wellington Street is part of State Route 65, which continues south from the street's eastern end to Riverside Drive, near The Causeway, and from the western end of the street to West Coast Highway south of City Beach.

History
Wellington Street was named after the Duke of Wellington. It existed as far back as 1838, although at that time it only extended as far east as Milligan Street. In 1894, the section of road continuing north-west of Milligan Street was known as Douro Street, although the name Douro Street for this section of road appears on maps as early as 1855. It is unclear, however, as to when this road extension was actually made, as maps from 1860 still show Lake Irwin with Douro Street and surrounding lots superimposed over it, suggesting the lake was yet to be drained and Douro Street was yet to be constructed.

A significant presence on the block between Wellington and Murray Streets was the Boans department store until 1986 when the building was demolished and replaced by the Forrest Chase shopping centre and the Myer department store. Former main offices along the street include Wesfarmers. Other former landmarks along Wellington Street include the now demolished Wellington Street bus station and Perth Entertainment Centre. The western and eastern ends of the street were locations of the city-based industries that survived until the 1950s when industry moved out into new industrial locations in the suburbs.

A considerable number of historical photographs are available of the street during its history.

Eastern end
The eastern end of Wellington Street has historically been and is currently the location of several government departments and facilities. Main Roads Western Australia is located in the Don Aitken Centre, at the north-east corner of the intersection at the eastern end of the street, and Royal Perth Hospital has buildings on both sides of the street, to the west of Lord Street.

Western end
Considerable change from industrial and residential purposes at the western end has occurred with office buildings being the dominant mode of building.

Transport facilities

The area of the street facing the Perth railway station to the north, Forrest Place to the south, and bound by Barrack Street to the east, and William Street to the west, was effectively the transport hub of Perth from the 1880s when the first railway station was built, until the 1960s when public transport and private car usage changed significantly in Perth.

Tram services developed along the street early.

The main transport facilities on the street have included the Wellington Street bus station and the Perth railway station. In 1933 the first permanent trolleybus system in Australia ran along Wellington Street. The underground Perth Busport, which opened in 2016 to replace the Wellington Street bus station, is located partially underneath the street, with a ramp for bus access originating at the intersection between Wellington and William Streets.

See also

References

 
Streets in Perth central business district, Western Australia
Streets in East Perth, Western Australia
Streets in West Perth, Western Australia